Marie-Claude Molnar, PLY (born 2 October 1983) is a C4 Canadian road and track cyclist. She won Canada's first medal in cycling at the 2012 London Paralympic Games.

https://mariecmlnar.com

References

1983 births
Canadian female cyclists
Cyclists from Quebec
Cyclists at the 2012 Summer Paralympics
Living people
Medalists at the 2012 Summer Paralympics
Paralympic bronze medalists for Canada
Sportspeople from Longueuil
Paralympic medalists in cycling
Paralympic cyclists of Canada
Medalists at the 2011 Parapan American Games
20th-century Canadian women
21st-century Canadian women